Zechariah 10 is the tenth of the total 14 chapters in the Book of Zechariah in the Hebrew Bible or the Old Testament of the Christian Bible. This book contains the prophecies attributed to the prophet Zechariah, and is a part of the Book of the Twelve Minor Prophets. This chapter is a part of a section (so-called "Second Zechariah") consisting of Zechariah 9–14.

Text
The original text was written in the Hebrew language. This chapter is divided into 12 verses.
 Continuation of the subject in the seventh chapter.

Textual witnesses
Some early manuscripts containing the text of this chapter in Hebrew are of the Masoretic Text, which includes the Codex Cairensis (from year 895), the Petersburg Codex of the Prophets (916), Aleppo Codex (930), and Codex Leningradensis (1008). Fragments containing parts of this chapter were found among the Dead Sea Scrolls, that is, 4Q82 (4QXIIg; 50–25 BCE) with extant verses 11–12.

There is also a translation into Koine Greek known as the Septuagint, made in the last few centuries BCE. Extant ancient manuscripts of the Septuagint version include Codex Vaticanus (B; B; 4th century), Codex Sinaiticus (S; BHK: S; 4th century), Codex Alexandrinus (A; A; 5th century) and Codex Marchalianus (Q; Q; 6th century).

Prophetic warning against superstition (10:1–2)
This part contains the oracle urging the people to turn to God alone and regrets the lack of proper leadership or shepherd. The polemic against the 'bad shepherds' here continues a tradition found in Jeremiah 23 and Ezekiel 34.

Verse 1
Ask ye of the Lord rain in the time of the latter rain; so the Lord shall make bright clouds, and give them showers of rain, to every one grass in the field.
"The latter rain": refers to the period of heavy rainfall in the spring of the year (around March or April) in Palestine. Eschatologically the "latter rain" points to "the end times" when God will pour out blessings (cf. Hosea 6:3; Joel 2:21-25).

Verse 2
  For the idols have spoken vanity,
 and the diviners have seen a lie, 
 and have told false dreams;
 they comfort in vain:
 therefore they went their way as a flock, they were troubled, 
 because there was no shepherd.
 " Idols": "teraphim"; sculptures or images of human form and sometimes of life size, in ancient times worshiped to grant temporal blessings or to provide oracles. The book of Hosea mentions "teraphim" with "ephod," as forbidden means of enquiry in the future ("without an ephod and without teraphim" ) and the book of Judges connects them with the mingled worship of Micah.
 "Have seen a lie": that is "being given up to judicial blindness", because these 'diviners' didn't care for the truth as the Targum calls "the diviners prophesy falsehood."
 "Have told false dreams": Vulgate, somniatores locuti sunt frustra; Greek Septuagint: , "spoke false dreams" (cf. ).
 "Comfort in vain": literally, "give vapor for comfort" (cf. ;). 
 "There was no shepherd": that is "no king to guard and lead them", so the people fell under the power of foreign rulers, who oppressed them.

Yahweh's holy war and the return from exile (10:3–12)
Yahweh will punish the bad shepherds (leaders) and will produce a leadership ("the cornerstone, the tent peg and the battle bow" in ) from the "house of Judah", so with YHWH's power alone the people are gathered from their places of exile similar to the Exodus.

See also

Related Bible parts: Psalm 118, Ezekiel 36, Ezekiel 37

Notes and references

Sources

External links

Jewish
Zechariah 10 Hebrew with Parallel English
Zechariah 10 Hebrew with Rashi's Commentary

Christian
Zechariah 10 English Translation with Parallel Latin Vulgate 

10